Terwa Dahigawan is a village in the Hardoi district of Uttar Pradesh state of India. It is a revenue village consisting one main village(Terwa) and a hamlet (Dahigawan). It comes under Kachhona block of Sandila Tahsil. The village has population of 3,597.

References

External links
Terwa Dahigawan Library Facebook page

Villages in Hardoi district